Moussoro is a town in Chad, lying  northeast of N'Djamena on the road to Faya-Largeau. An important transportation centre, it lies in a dry river bed and as a result has more vegetation than is typical in the area.

Moussoro is the capital of the region of Barh El Gazel (Bahr el Gazel). The town is served by Moussoro Airport.
Moussoro is inhabited by Gouran (Krreda)(Karra) ethnic group of northern Chad. It serves as their commercial and administrative town. Moussoro market day is Thursday. They mostly known by their agricultural activity.

Moussoro have the second president's residence in Chad after the main Residence in N'djamena (see image below). The town is also the main area for army training in Chad.

Gallery

References

Bahr el Gazel Region
Populated places in Chad